The Commissioner of Police, Kolkata is the chief of the Kolkata Police. The Kolkata Police Commissioner is appointed by the Government of West Bengal and reports independently to the Home Secretary of the State.  The headquarter is at 18, Lal Bazar Street, near B.B.D. Bagh area of Central Kolkata.

The commissioner is an Indian Police Service officer of the rank of Additional Director General (ADG) of Police. The person heads the almost 35,000 strong metropolitan police force in a jurisdiction consisting of approximately 243 km2 area and is the home to 14,617,992 people (2011 census figures).

List of Commissioners of Police, Kolkata

See also
 Bidhannagar Police Commissionerate
 Commissioner of Police, Bangalore City
 Commissioner of Police, Delhi

Notes

References 

Police officers from Kolkata
Indian police chiefs